Mario Yanez (born 29 July 1993 in Mexico City) is a Mexican professional squash player. As of February 2018, he was ranked number 212 in the world, and number 10 in Mexico. He has competed in and reached the final stages of multiple professional PSA World Tour tournaments.

References

1993 births
Living people
Mexican male squash players
Rochester Yellowjackets men's squash players